Nods may refer to:

Nods, Switzerland
Nods, Doubs, France

See also 

 NOD (disambiguation)
 Noddies (disambiguation)